The 1979–80 New Hampshire Wildcats men's basketball team  represented the University of New Hampshire during the 1979–80 NCAA Division I men's basketball season. The Wildcats, led by eleventh year head coach Gerry Friel, played their home games at Lundholm Gym and were members of the ECAC North, however the conference did not conduct conference play for the 1979–80 season. They finished the season 4–22 to finish in tenth place. They did not qualify for the ECAC North tournament.

Roster

Schedule

|-
!colspan=9| Regular season

References

New Hampshire
New Hampshire Wildcats men's basketball seasons
Wild
Wild